The Diocese of Orange (Latin: Dioecesis Arausicanae in California; Spanish: Diócesis de Orange; Vietnamese: Giáo phận Quận Cam)  is a Latin Church ecclesiastical territory or diocese of the Catholic Church whose territory comprises the whole of Orange County, California, in the United States. It may sometimes be referred to as the Diocese of Orange in California, to avoid confusion with the historical Diocese of Orange in Orange, France, which was dissolved in 1801.

The Diocese of Orange is a suffragan diocese in the ecclesiastical province of the metropolitan Archdiocese of Los Angeles, from which territory it was erected in 1976. The diocesan cathedral is the Christ Cathedral in the Garden Grove. The current diocesan bishop is Kevin Vann, who was officially installed on December 10, 2012. Diocesan offices are situated at the Christ Cathedral campus in Garden Grove, Orange County California.

In addition to its 56 parish churches, the diocese oversees 41 schools and three general hospitals, plus one disabled and five ethnic ministry centers. It also sponsors a variety of programs and activities in conjunction with other local organizations.

The diocesan patron saints are Our Lady of Guadalupe and Saint Andrew Dũng-Lạc.

History

The Catholic presence in present-day Orange County dates to the 1776 establishment of Mission San Juan Capistrano, a Spanish mission founded by Father Junipero Serra and the Franciscan order. At the time the region was part of the Las Californias province of New Spain. In 1804 present-day Orange County became part of Alta California when Las Californias was split in two; Alta California then became part of Mexico when the latter gained independence from Spain in 1821. From the mission, the missionary priests set out to convert the native population to Catholicism; over 4,000 people were converted between 1776 and 1847.

In 1840, the Holy See erected the Diocese of the Two Californias to recognize the growth of the provinces of Alta California and Baja California. This diocese – with its episcopal see located in Monterey – included all Mexican territory west of the Colorado River and the Gulf of California (the modern U.S. states of California and Nevada, and parts of Utah, Arizona, and Colorado, as well as the modern Mexican states of Baja California and Baja California Sur).

After Mexico ceded Alta California to the United States in 1848, after the Mexican–American War, the Mexican government objected to an American bishop having jurisdiction over parishes in Mexican Baja California. The Holy See split the diocese into American and Mexican sections, and the American section was renamed the Diocese of Monterey. In 1859, the diocese became known as the Diocese of Monterey-Los Angeles to recognize the growth of the city of Los Angeles; the see was transferred to Los Angeles in 1876. In 1922, the diocese split again, and Orange County became part of the newly erected Diocese of Los Angeles-San Diego, which became the Archdiocese of Los Angeles in 1936.

Orange County remained part of the Archdiocese of Los Angeles until March 24, 1976, when Pope Paul VI established the Diocese of Orange. Los Angeles auxiliary bishop William Robert Johnson was appointed the first Bishop of Orange; the existing Holy Family Church in Orange was designated as cathedral of the new diocese. The diocese has grown rapidly as the local population has swelled with Catholic immigrants from Vietnam, the Philippines, and Latin America, and in 2010 claimed a Catholic population of over 1.2 million.

At the mandatory retirement age, Bishop Tod David Brown retired on September 21, 2012. The Holy See named Bishop Kevin Vann of the Diocese of Fort Worth to succeed him.

Clergy sexual abuse settlement

On January 3, 2005, Bishop Brown apologized to 87 victims of sexual abuse and announced a settlement of $100 million following two years of mediation. In addition, 91 victims received an average of $659,000 each. Perpetrators included 31 priests, ten lay people, two nuns, and one brother.

Bishops
The lists of ordinaries and auxiliaries of the diocese and their years of service:

Bishops of Orange
 William Robert Johnson (1976-1986)
 Norman McFarland (1986-1998)
 Tod David Brown (1998-2012)
 Kevin Vann (2012–present)

Auxiliary bishops
 John Thomas Steinbock (1984-1987), appointed Bishop of Santa Rosa in California and later Bishop of Fresno
 Michael Patrick Driscoll (1989-1999), appointed Bishop of Boise
 Jaime Soto (2000-2007), appointed Bishop of Sacramento
 Dominic Mai Luong (2003-2015)
 Cirilo Flores (2009-2012), appointed Coadjutor Bishop and later Bishop of San Diego
 Timothy Edward Freyer (2017–present)
 Thanh Thai Nguyen (2017–present)

Churches

Cathedral

In 2001, Bishop Brown first announced plans to build a new cathedral to succeed the Cathedral of the Holy Family. However, soon after, the Catholic sexual abuse scandal burst into the diocese, and Brown deemed it "inappropriate" to raise funds for a new cathedral in light of the scandal. In 2005, the diocese purchased land in south Santa Ana and established Christ Our Savior Cathedral Parish, with the intention of someday building a cathedral on the property. The cost of building a cathedral on the Santa Ana site was estimated to be as high as $200 million, which prompted comparisons to the cost of building the Cathedral of Our Lady of the Angels in Los Angeles.

In October 2010, Crystal Cathedral Ministries, the Protestant congregation that owned and worshiped in the eponymous Crystal Cathedral building in Garden Grove, filed for bankruptcy protection. Several months later, the diocese announced that it was "potentially interested" in buying the building and converting it into a diocesan cathedral as a potential cost and time-saving alternative over building a new cathedral on the Santa Ana site.

On November 17, 2011, a U.S. bankruptcy court judge in Santa Ana approved the sale of the Crystal Cathedral building and adjacent campus to the diocese for $57.5 million; the sale was finalized on February 3, 2012. At that time, the diocese ended all efforts at building a cathedral on the Santa Ana site and removed "Cathedral" from Christ Our Savior Parish's name, repurposing it as a diocesan parish church. On June 9, 2012, the diocese announced that the Crystal Cathedral would be known as "Christ Cathedral" when it becomes the new seat of the diocese. The building's new name was designated by the Holy See, while suggestions were also taken from the diocese and its members.

In 2014, following its purchase of the site, the diocese announced plans to renovate the Crystal Cathedral in order to suit the liturgy of the Catholic Church, while maintaining the building's architectural qualities. Construction for the $72 million project began in June 2017, and was completed in 2019.

In June 2013, the diocese officially transferred St. Callistus Parish to the Crystal Cathedral campus, and the parish began to hold Mass on the campus. At the same time Crystal Cathedral Ministries moved to St. Callistus' former facility, located one mile from the Crystal Cathedral, which the diocese offered to lease to Crystal Cathedral Ministries as a term of the sale of the Crystal Cathedral campus. St. Callistus' parish school was transferred to the former Crystal Cathedral Academy facility and renamed Christ Cathedral Academy in September 2013.

Education
The diocese oversees 31 parochial elementary schools and 3 high schools; additionally, 3 independent Catholic elementary schools and 4 independent Catholic high schools (i.e., run by a religious order or independent Board of Trustees) are located in the diocese.

High schools

Diocesan
Mater Dei High School, Santa Ana, California
Rosary High School, Fullerton, California
Santa Margarita Catholic High School, Rancho Santa Margarita, California

Independent
 JSerra Catholic High School, San Juan Capistrano, California
 Servite High School, Anaheim

Closed Schools
Cornelia Connelly High School, Anaheim, California
 St. Michael's Preparatory School, Silverado, California

See also

 Catholic Church by country
 Hierarchy of the Catholic Church
 List of the Catholic dioceses of the United States

References

External links

Orange Catholic Foundation, endowment fund

 
Religion in Orange County, California
Orange
Orange
Organizations based in Orange County, California
Orange
Christian organizations established in 1976
1976 establishments in California